Unione Sportiva Dilettantistica Città di Fasano is an Italian association football club located in Fasano, Apulia. The club plays in Serie D.

References

 
Football clubs in Apulia
Fasano
Association football clubs established in 1964
Serie D clubs
Italian football clubs established in 1964